is a former Japanese football player and manager.

Playing career
Nakata was born in Osaka Prefecture on January 17, 1962. After graduating from Tokai University, he played Fujita Industries (1984-1991) and Otsuka Pharmaceutical (1991-1993).

Coaching career
After retirement, Nakata started coaching career at Otsuka Pharmaceutical (later Tokushima Vortis). He coached at Otsuka Pharmaceutical (1993-1995), Yokohama F. Marinos (1996-1999), Cerezo Osaka (2000-2003) and Nagoya Grampus Eight (2004-2007). In 2005, he also managed Nagoya Grampus Eight from September to December. In 2008, he moved to Tokushima Vortis and became Technical Advisor until October 2014. In 2015, he moved to Yokohama FC and became Technical Director. In September 2015, manager Miloš Rus resigned for health reasons. Nakata became a manager and managed 11 matches until end of the season. In 2016 season, although Rus returned to manager, Rus resigned for heart arrhythmia in June. So, Nakata became a manager again. In October 2017, he was sacked for poor performance.

Managerial statistics

References

External links

1962 births
Living people
Tokai University alumni
Association football people from Osaka Prefecture
Japanese footballers
Japan Soccer League players
Japan Football League (1992–1998) players
Shonan Bellmare players
Tokushima Vortis players
Japanese football managers
J1 League managers
J2 League managers
Nagoya Grampus managers
Yokohama FC managers
Association football defenders